Dasysphinx baroni is a moth of the subfamily Arctiinae. It was described by Rothschild in 1910. It is found in Ecuador.

References

Euchromiina
Moths described in 1910